Youth Anthems for the New Order is the first album by punk band Reagan Youth. Recorded at High 5 Studios, NYC in 1983-1984, the album was released folded in a large two sided poster instead of a traditional album cover. It was subsequently re-released with three extra tracks as Reagan Youth (Volume 1) on New Red Archives.

Track listing 
 "New Aryans"
 "Reagan Youth"
 "(Are You) Happy?"
 "I Hate Hate"
 "Degenerated"
 "U.S.@."
 "(You're A) Gonowhere"

Personnel 
 "Dave Insurgent" (Dave Rubinstein) - Vocals
 "Paul Cripple" (Paul Bakija) - Guitar
 Al Pike - Bass
 Steve Weissman - Drums
 Russ, Jerry, Andy Apathy, Poss, Tripper - Backing Vocals
 Jerry Williams - Engineer
 Produced by Reagan Youth in conjunction with R Radical Records

1984 debut albums
Reagan Youth albums